Lake Lorne, a small  freshwater lake on the Bellarine Peninsula, Victoria, Australia, is located immediately south-west of the township of Drysdale.

Location and features
The lake is a popular birdwatching site and is well known for its variety of waterbirds, many of which have been recorded as breeding there. Lake Lorne lies in a depression in the underlying limestone and has no surface outlet.  Water levels may vary substantially, often with a lag time in response to rainfall, with the nearby McLeods Waterholes being part of the same hydrological system.  It contains a central complex of three islets densely vegetated with willows, eucalypts, paperbarks and pittosporums.  The lake is largely surrounded by parkland and is close to the Drysdale railway station.

Birds
The lake is important for freckled and blue-billed ducks which are listed as threatened in Victoria.  Waterbirds, waders and rails which have bred at the lake include black swans, hardheads, musk ducks, Australasian and hoary-headed grebes, darters, little pied and little black cormorants, dusky moorhens, purple swamphens, Eurasian coots and black-fronted dotterels.  It is also a roosting site for hundreds of cormorants and ibises.

References

Lorne
Bellarine Peninsula
Birdwatching sites in Australia